Scarborough—Rouge River was a provincial electoral district in Ontario, Canada, that was represented in the Legislative Assembly of Ontario between 1999 and 2018.

The riding covers the northeast part of the Scarborough part of Toronto.  It stretches from Highway 401 in the south to Steeles Avenue in the north.  In the east it ends at the border with Pickering and to just west of Midland in the west.

In 2018, the district was dissolved into Scarborough—Rouge Park and Scarborough North.

Demographics
According to the Canada 2011 Census
 Ethnic Groups: 32.8% South Asian, 30.8% Chinese, 10.7% Black, 8.7% White, 8.2% Filipino, 1.6% Southeast Asian 
 Languages: 40.0% English, 27.1% Chinese, 13.2% Tamil, 4.2% Tagalog, 3.0% Urdu, 2.4% Gujarati, 1.4% Punjabi 
 Religion: 39.2% Christian (19.1% Catholic, 2.7% Pentecostal, 2.4% Anglican, 1.8% Baptist, 1.1% Christian Orthodox, 12.1% Other Christian), 20.7% Hindu, 8.9% Muslim, 4.7% Buddhist, 1.2% Sikh, 25.0% No religion. 
 Average household income: $74,241
 Median household income: $61,786
 Average individual income: $28,328
 Median individual income: $21,187

In 2001, 13.6% of the population was Hindu, the highest in Canada.

Geography

Scarborough—Rouge River consisted of the part of the City of Toronto bounded on the north and east by the city limits, on the west by Midland Avenue, and on the south by a line drawn from the east city limit west along Finch Avenue East, south along Meadowvale Road, west along Sheppard Avenue East, south along Morningside Avenue, west along Highway 401, north along Brimley Road, and west along Finch Avenue East to Midland Avenue.

The provincial electoral district was created in 1999 when provincial ridings were defined to have the same borders as federal ridings.

The riding contained the neighbourhoods of Agincourt (part), Armadale, Malvern, Milliken (part) and Morningside Heights.

Members of Provincial Parliament

Election results

	
	

	

^ Change is from 2003 redistributed results.

2007 electoral reform referendum

References

Notes

Citations

Sources
Elections Ontario Past Election Results

Former provincial electoral districts of Ontario
Provincial electoral districts of Toronto
Scarborough, Toronto